Lunghua Civil Assembly Centre was one of the internment camps eventually established by the Empire of Japan in Shanghai for European and American citizens, who had been resident under Japanese occupation since December 1941. Many had formerly lived in Shanghai within the Shanghai International Settlement before its occupation by the imperial Japanese army.

J. G. Ballard was interned in the camp as an adolescent. His experiences there inspired the book (and subsequent movie) Empire of the Sun.

Description
Lunghua Civil Assembly Centre was originally the Jiangsu Shanghai High School. It was located on Minghong Road about three miles (5 km) from Shanghai Longhua Airport. (Pre-WWII documents use the alternate spellings of Lunghua and Lunghwa; the modern anglicized spelling of the town is Longhua.) The school was damaged in the Second Sino-Japanese War and was empty until it was designated as a Civil Assembly Centre. It was then used from 1943 to intern 1,988 people.

"The camp was large, containing seven concrete buildings, five large wooden barracks (originally built as stables by the Japanese), and numerous outbuildings. There were fifty nine dorms and 127 rooms for families."

The buildings on the site were built orthogonal to each other on a 42-acre site. The overall site was aligned slightly east of north. Therefore, in the description below, when a building is described as being built east–west it is more accurately described as ENE–WSW, and when a building is described as being built north–south, it is more accurately described as SSW–NNE.

The Assembly Hall was the central building. North of it were the single storey wooden buildings A, B and C. These were built parallel to each other, with each having been built east–west and with Building A as the furthest north. South of the Assembly Hall, also built east–west, was the three storey Building F, which was the administration block. South of Building F was the entrance and southeast was the three storey Building E built north–south. East of the Assembly Hall was the three storey Building D which was an accommodation block for families, built north–south.

West of the Assembly Hall and the wooden buildings were two ruined buildings built north–south and further west of the ruined buildings was the two storey Building G built east–west. Northwest of Building G, in the northwest corner of the site, was the single storey Hospital which was built east–west.  The hospital dealt with malaria sufferers.  Women who became pregnant were sent to a hospital in Shanghai then moved on to another camp for women and babies.  Between Building G and the Hospital were the five Commandant's Staff Residences arranged around a square with three on the northern edge and two on the western edge. Building G was on the southern edge.

North of the wooden buildings were the two single-storey dining rooms (built east–west), and north of each of those was a single-storey kitchen. In the northeast corner of the site, north of Building D, were two parallel, single-storey buildings built north–south. These were Building H, which was used to accommodate single people, and Building I (or J, the documents differ as to the name of this building). North of these were the single-storey shower block (built east–west) and east of the shower block was another single-storey building built north–south, Building J (or K, the documents differ as to the name of this building).

The recreation ground contained a football pitch and was in the area of ground between the Assembly Hall and Building D.

There were persistent issues with water supply and drainage.  The presence of malaria and typhoid were also a threat to public health.

Although the camp's commandant was Japanese, the guards were Korean.

Children interned in the camp attended classes at a school on the site which was called Lunhgwa Academy. The adults had jobs and a self-elected council. There were also various social activities such as parties and lectures.

Current site
The site of the camp is southwest of the Shanghai Botanical Garden. It is on the corner of Baise Road (百色路) and North Longchuan Road (龙川北路), currently the site of Shanghai High School and its international division. The Botanical Garden is southwest of Longhua Airport; both of these are clearly identified on satellite images. Satellite images show that there are buildings on the site in the "same" location as the Civil Assembly Centre buildings. The site of the camp is now enclosed by housing, but can be identified by the rectangular area (once Buildings A, B and C) and trees. The turning circle in the drive which is south of Building F, can also be seen.

Buildings A, B and C are no longer there, one of the Staff Residences has been demolished and one of the kitchens no longer exists. The ruined building adjacent to the Assembly Hall appears to have been rebuilt the same shape and there are several new buildings built on the site of the other ruined building. There are several new buildings between Building G and the Staff Residences. In addition, there is a road now between Building H and the rest of the site.

G Block was demolished in 2009.

References

Citations

Sources 

These descriptions were written by Richard Grimes from maps and documents produced by his grandfather Bertram John William Grimes who was interned in the camp from 17 March 1943 and was released on 20 October 1945. Richard's grandmother, Ethel Mary Grimes, and his father, Norman William Grimes, were also interned at Lunghua on 17 March 1943 and were released on 31 August 1945.

Buildings and structures in Shanghai
Japanese prisoner of war and internment camps
History of Shanghai
Xuhui District